This Is Roller Derby is a 2011 Australian documentary film by Daniel Hayward on four Australian roller derby teams over the course of a season.

The film features members from roller derby associations from Australia and the United States, primarily the  Ballarat Roller Derby League. The DVD for the film released on 20 February 2013.

Synopsis
The film follows four Australian roller derby leagues, Ballarat Roller Derby League, Adelaide Roller Derby, Canberra Roller Derby League and Geelong Roller Derby League, over the course of twelve months, and documents the start of roller derby in Australia and overseas.

Cast and crew 
The film was directed by Daniel Hayward and features members from the Ballarat Roller Derby League and members from US leagues, particularly Texas Rollergirls and TXRD Lonestar Rollergirls.

Some featured Roller Derby skaters include:

 April Ritzenthaler (Narrator)
 Katrina "Mad Mac" MacDonald
 Haylee "Seven Lux" Hartley
 Rebekah "Apocalypse Nerd" Bailey
 Sarah "Barrelhouse Bessy" Strong-Law
 Nadia "Smartypants" Keane
 Michelle "Miss Hellfire" Murrel
 Kim "Jelli Knight" Adams

Reception
Filmink gave a positive review for This Is Roller Derby, calling it a "gutsy and eye-opening insight into a sport on the rise and the world around it." SBS gave a mixed review for the film, saying that while the first half of the film has "genuine energy", that "in driving his material towards a feature-length running time of 80-odd minutes, Hayward steers into a cul-de-sac, showing longer extracts of the action from tournaments rather than digger deeper into some of the personal stories."

References

External links

Australian sports documentary films
Roller derby films
2011 documentary films
2011 films
Roller derby in Australia
Films shot in Victoria (Australia)
Films shot in Adelaide
2010s English-language films